Ramrod Key is an island in the lower Florida Keys.  Originally named Roberts Island, Ramrod Key was renamed for a ship named Ramrod, which was wrecked on a reef south of there in the early nineteenth century.

Description
Until the construction of U.S. Route 1 in the 1920s, the only building on Ramrod was a post office that was alongside the train tracks. U.S. 1 (or the Overseas Highway) crosses Ramrod Key at approximately mile markers 26–27.5, between Summerland Key and Middle Torch Key.

Ramrod Key is a popular tourist site due to the short distance between the island and Looe Key. Current (2014) commercial enterprises of visitor interest include a dive shop-hotel-bar/restaurant complex, numerous sport fishing charters ,a bar/restaurant and miniature golf complex, a gas station-grocery, and a Cuban deli/grocery.

References

Islands of the Florida Keys
Islands of Monroe County, Florida
Islands of Florida